An untitled 1973 stainless steel sculpture by Lee Kelly is installed on the Washington State Capitol campus in Olympia, Washington, United States.

References

1973 establishments in Washington (state)
1973 sculptures
Outdoor sculptures in Olympia, Washington
Sculptures by Lee Kelly
Washington State Capitol campus